Marguerite Lazarus, née Jackson (born 1 May 1916 in Durham, England – d. 24 September 2004 in North Yorkshire, England) was a British writer.  She started writing children's fiction as Marguerite J. Gascoigne, and later romance novels under the pseudonym of Anna Gilbert. Her novel The Look of Innocence  won in 1976 the Romantic Novel of the Year Award by the Romantic Novelists' Association.

Biography
Marguerite Jackson was born on 1 May 1916 in Durham, England, UK. On 1937, she obtained a BA with honours and on 1957 an MA at Durham University. She worked as Grammar school English teacher from 1938 to 1973. On 5 April 1956, she married Jacob "Jack" Lazarus.

She published Children's fiction as Marguerite J. Gascoigne, and later gothic romance novels as Anna Gilbert.

Marguerite died at 88, on 24 September 2004 in North Yorkshire, England.

Bibliography

As Marguerite J. Gascoigne

Single novels
 The Song of the Gipsy (1953)

As Anna Gilbert

Single novels
 Images of Rose (1974)
 The Look of Innocence (1975)
 A Family Likeness (1977)
 Remembering Louise (1978)
 The Leavetaking (1979)
 Flowers for Lilian (1980)
 Miss Bede Is Staying (1982)
 The Long Shadow (1983)
 A Walk in the Wood (1989)
 The Wedding Guest (1993)
 Treachery of Time (1995)
 A Hint of Witchcraft (2000)
 A Morning in Eden (2001)

References and sources

1916 births
2004 deaths
People from Durham, England
British children's writers
British women novelists
RoNA Award winners
20th-century British novelists
21st-century British novelists
20th-century British women writers
21st-century British women writers
Women romantic fiction writers
Pseudonymous women writers
20th-century pseudonymous writers
21st-century pseudonymous writers
Alumni of Armstrong College, Durham